El Zapote Airport  is an airport serving the village of El Zapote in Ahuachapán Department, El Salvador. The runway is on a point in the Bahia de Jiquilisco.

See also

Transport in El Salvador
List of airports in El Salvador

References

External links
 OpenStreetMap - El Zapote
 HERE/Nokia - El Zapote
 FalllingRain  - El Zapote Airport

Airports in El Salvador